Kali is a genus of plants in the subfamily Salsoloideae in the family Amaranthaceae. Common names of various members of this genus include buckbush, rolypoly, tumbleweed for its wind-blown seed dispersal habit, and Tartar thistle and Russian thistle for its origins.

These species were previously part of the genus Salsola.

Systematics 
The type species of the genus is Kali turgidum. The genus consists of ca. 23 species:

 Kali australe (R.Br.) Akhani & E.H.Roalson (syn. Salsola kali R.Br.)
 Kali basalticum C.Brullo, Brullo, Gaskin, Giusso, Hrusa & Salmeri (2015): endemic to Sicily at Mount Etna.
 Kali collinum (Pall.) Akhani & E.H.Roalson (Salsola collina Pall.)
 Kali dodecanesicum C.Brullo, Brullo, Giusso, Ilardi (2015): endemic on the Greek islands Rhodes, Kos and Nisyros.
 Kali gobicola (Iljin) Brullo & Hrusa (2015), (Syn.: Salsola gobicola Iljin)
 Kali griffithii (Bunge) Akhani & E.H.Roalson (Noaea griffithii Bunge)
 Kali jacquemontii (Moq.) Akhani & E.H.Roalson  (Salsola jacquemontii Moq.)
 Kali ikonnikovii (Iljin) Akhani & E.H.Roalson (Salsola ikonnikovii Iljin)
 Kali komarovii (Iljin) Akhani & E.H.Roalson (Salsola komarovii Iljin)
 Kali macrophyllum (R.Br.) Galasso & Bartolucci (2014), (Syn.: Salsola macrophylla R.Br, Salsola tragus L. subsp. pontica (Pall.) Rilke)
 Kali monopterum (Bunge) Lomon. (2012), (Syn.: Salsola monoptera Bunge)
 Kali nepalensis (Grubov) Brullo, Giusso & Hrusa (2015), (Syn.: Salsola nepalensis Grubov)
 Kali paulsenii  (Litv.) Akhani & E.H.Roalson (Salsola paulsenii Litv.)
 Kali pellucidum (Litv.) Brullo, Giusso & Hrusa (2015), (Syn.: Salsola pellucida Litv.)
 Kali praecox (Litv.) Sukhor. (2011), (Syn.: Salsola praecox (Litv.) Iljin)
 Kali rosaceum (L.) Moench
 Kali sinkiangense (A.J.Li) Brullo, Giusso & Hrusa (2015), (Syn.:Salsola sinkiangensis A.J.Li)
 Kali ryanii (Hrusa & Gaskin) Brullo & Hrusa (2015), (Syn.:Salsola ryanii Hrusa & Gaskin)
 Kali tamamschjanae (Iljin) Akhani & E.H.Roalson (Salsola tamamschjanae Iljin)
 Kali tamariscinum (Pall.) Akhani & E.H.Roalson (Salsola tamariscina Pall.)
 Kali tragus (L.) Scop. (Salsola tragus L., Salsola kali ssp. tragus)
 Kali turgidum (Dumort.) Guterm.<ref>{{cite journal | author = Gutermann W | year = 2011 | title = Notulae nomenclaturales 41–45. Neue Namen bei Cruciata und Kali sowie einige kleinere Korrekturen | journal = Phyton (Horn) | volume = 51 | issue = 1| page = 98 }}</ref> (Kali soda Moench, Salsola kali L. ssp. kali)
 Kali zaidamicum (Iljin) Akhani & E.H.Roalson (Salsola zaidamica Iljin)

In 2014, Mosyakin et al. proposed to conserve Salsola kali (= Kali turgidum) as nomenclatoral type for the genus Salsola. If the proposal will be accepted, all species of genus Kali would belong to Salsola again. The General Committee of the XIX International Botanical Congress approved Mosyakin et al.'s proposal, rendering the species related to Salsola kali as constituting the genus Salsola, while those related to Salsola soda should be transferred to another genus.

Invasive species
Several species, most notably the central Asian Kali tragus, are invasive species outside their native range. They have encroached into parts of North America, where they are listed as noxious weeds by the United States Department of Agriculture. The salt-tolerant genus was first reported in the United States around 1877 in Bon Homme County, South Dakota, apparently transported as a stowaway in flax seed exported by Ukrainian farmers. South Dakota proved too harsh and dry for growing flax, however, and by 1900 Kali had colonized as far west as the Pacific Coast. It was also actively introduced by the USDA as experimental food for cattle that could be grown in hard times during droughts. Palatability of the young shoots is considered to be fair. Cattle, sheep, and horses eat it if nothing better is available. Small rodents and pronghorn also graze on the young shoots. Kali'' thrives wherever land use has disturbed the soil. It can be seen in Death Valley, California, and in Colorado at elevations of 8500 feet (2600 m).

Gallery

References

Amaranthaceae
Amaranthaceae genera
Halophytes
Tumbleweeds
Barilla plants
Taxa named by Philip Miller